General elections were held in Romania on 20 May 1990 to elect the President and members of Parliament. They were the first elections held after the overthrow of the Communist regime six months earlier and the first free elections held in the country since 1937. It was also the first time the president had been directly elected, the position having been previously elected by the legislature since it was introduced in 1974.

The National Salvation Front (FSN), which had headed the interim government that took power after the overthrow of Nicolae Ceaușescu, won a decisive victory. Opposition parties performed well below expectations; none of them had the time or resources to present themselves as alternatives to the FSN. Interim President and FSN leader Ion Iliescu was elected for a full term with 85 percent of the vote. The FSN also won large majorities in both houses of Parliament, with 263 of the 395 seats in the Assembly of Deputies and 91 of the 118 seats in the Senate.

The United States State Department expressed concerns about organised violence and polling irregularities, but concluded that they had had no effect on the outcome and pronounced the elections free and fair.

To date, this is the only time since direct presidential elections were introduced that a president has been elected without the need for a runoff. Iliescu's 85 percent vote share also remains the highest for a direct presidential election.

Presidential candidates

Results

President

Parliament

Senate

Assembly of Deputies

References

Romanian Revolution
Parliamentary elections in Romania
Presidential elections in Romania
1990 elections in Romania
General election